Ray Quinn (24 December 1913 – 3 February 1973) was a former Australian rules footballer who played with Carlton in the Victorian Football League (VFL).

Notes

External links 

Ray Quinn's profile at Blueseum

1913 births
1973 deaths
Carlton Football Club players
Australian rules footballers from Victoria (Australia)